Nasrabad (also Romanized as Naşrābād) is a village in Darzab Rural District, in the Central District of Mashhad County, Razavi Khorasan Province, Iran. At the 2006 census, its population was 129, with 37 families.

References 

Populated places in Mashhad County